WVOM may refer to:

WVOM-FM, a radio station (103.9 FM) licensed to serve Howland, Maine, United States
WVOM (AM), a defunct radio station (1450 AM) formerly licensed to serve Rockland, Maine